Charles R. Bush III  (born in Louisiana) is a filmmaker primarily known for co-starring with Kevin Costner in the 1985 film Fandango.  In recent years Bush has become known as an entertainment entrepreneur, expanding his business holdings to film and television companies, a record label and a video game development studios.

Background 
Charles R. Bush, III was born in New Orleans, however "Chuck" grew up in the nearby city of Houma, Louisiana.  In 1982 Bush moved to Austin, Texas.  On April 3, 1983, at the age of 21, he entered a 7-11 store at the same moment Kevin Reynolds was exiting. Reynolds was in Austin to begin principal photography on his film Fandango, and Bush resembled a character that Reynolds had been unsuccessful in casting. The two men spoke briefly and Bush was asked to audition the next morning. Reynolds cast Chuck Bush as the serene "Dorman," a gentle-giant-type who rounded out a cast that included actors Kevin Costner and Judd Nelson.

Following Fandango Bush took a lead role in a horror film, Terror in the Swamp, being produced by his high school friend, Martin Folse.

1990s 
Bush has since found success as producer, editor and writer of several family films and television projects.  In 1990, Bush moved back to Louisiana.  In 1995, Bush was the Supervising Producer on the film Breezy Hill.  And in 1996 he produced the film Favorite Son.  Bush then formed Burning Bush Communications, Inc. to assist in the production of non-toxic motion pictures shot around the world.

Burning Bush's largest client was The Visual Bible Project, which produced two epic-length motion pictures in the late 1990s.  Burning Bush, in conjunction with LA Entertainment Group, developed 23 products for The Visual Bible.  Burning Bush, in a strategic alliance with IBM Interactive Media, produced the first two disc DVD of an epic motion picture beginning in 1997 and released ultimately in 1999.  That project was The Visual Bible's The Gospel According to Matthew, a word for word dramatic performance of the NIV Bible brought to life on film.

Mr. Bush also created the company Burning Bush Studios for audio post production of motion pictures.  Here he was executive producer.  Both these companies were located in Baton Rouge.  During their existence, one or both of the Burning Bush companies took part in the post production of seven feature-length motion pictures. These films were produced in the United States, Morocco, Italy and Poland.

He married his wife, Angela Brown Bush, on October 5, 1996. She became Burning Bush's composer and music editor.  These companies lasted until the early 2000s.

2000s 

In 2003, Mr. Bush's company was the "employer partner" of a $1,000,000 grant provided by the Federal TANF2 program wherein Baton Rouge Community College acquired motion picture production equipment to train industry workers. Mr. Bush developed a curriculum and taught 110 students various aspects of the industry such as screen writing, lighting, camera and editing. In 2007, 83 of those students that went from welfare to work are still involved in the film industry and are now contributing to the economy.

In 2006, Chuck organized FTE Consulting Group, LLC in order to help other production companies and state governments enjoy the benefits of a mobile entertainment industry.  He has consulted with the state of Mississippi on their recent tax incentives, he has worked with a facility in Alabama to attract film productions to its location and is currently working with two national television programs to help maximize their ratings and expand into ancillary markets.

Recent work 
Bush is still an active film producer .  Now he has FTE Consulting Group, LLC which is a consultant firm exclusively for entertainment industry entities (state governments, production companies).  Bush developed this company because of so many entertainment economies popping up around the country (Mississippi, Alabama, etc.).  FTE's biggest client is Red Stick Studio Development, LLC which plans to build a $955 million  studio city in Baton Rouge.  The development itself will be a full service production facility with 18 soundstages, full postproduction, location equipment rentals, a hotel and other living accommodations; the whole nine yards. As of May 2009, this studio development has not begun construction.

Bush's new entertainment company, Resurgent Entertainment, LLC,  is the exclusive production company for this studio development.  The company has an entertainment fund that will undertake co-production deals with film producers/production companies.  Resurgent will exclusively produce "non-toxic" motion pictures, television, music and video games.  Projects include a post-Hurricane Katrina documentary, The Kindness of Strangers and a music project entitled The Gospel According to Hip Hop.

In 2007, Mr. Bush became a founding member of the Louisiana Entertainment Industries Association, Inc., a non-profit trade association whose purpose is to lobby policymakers and endorse industry professionals and entrepreneurs.  Bush currently serves as LEIA's Executive Director.

Into 2008 
Ending 2007, Bush has formed the virtual studio, Resurgent Interactive, LLC,  which has immediately acquired Tesseraction Games, Inc., creators of the naval action game Enigma: Rising Tide.  Resurgent has already developed an add-on for Enigma  entitled Hotel Da Volta, based on the short story by Jay Lake (Enigmacon 2004).  This acquisition has expanded Bush's holdings to include film and television companies, a music label and now video game development studios. Resurgent plans to begin development of the Enigma sequel in early 2008.

Resurgent Interactive failed sometime in 2008. Tesseraction Games officially went out of business on December 19, 2008, due to Resurgent Interactive going into default. The Hotel Da Volta add-on and Enigma: Rising Tide Chapter Two sequel were never released.

References

External links 

American television producers
American television directors
American male screenwriters
Living people
Vandebilt Catholic High School alumni
Film directors from Louisiana
Screenwriters from Louisiana
Film producers from Louisiana
Year of birth missing (living people)